Going on Record is a self-released album by the American vocalist, pianist and songwriter Oleta Adams and was released in 1983. It is her second one after the 1982 Untitled album.

The album was recorded live, from a performance at the Kansas City Music Hall on July 30, 1983. Adams would re-record 3 of her original songs on the album, "Don't Look Too Closely", "I've Gotta Sing My Song" and "You Won't Get Away", on later albums when she signed to major label Fontana Records.

Track listing

Personnel
 Oleta Adams - lead vocals, piano
 Walter Bryant - piano, synthesizer
 Gordon Twist - piano, backing vocals
 Carolyn Nelson, Eugene Williams - backing vocals
 Lee Jones - bass guitar
 John Cushon - drums

Production 
 Curtis Pickering : Producer
 Chris Bauer: Engineer

1983 albums
Oleta Adams albums